Okinawa 2nd district is a constituency of the House of Representatives in the Diet of Japan (national legislature). It is located in Okinawa Prefecture and encompasses the cities of Urasoe and Ginowan, and Nakagami District. As of 2016, 288,070 eligible voters were registered in the district.

The district is represented by Kunio Arakaki of the Social Democratic Party. It is the only Diet single-seat constituency held by the SDP.

Background 
The district was considered a stronghold for veteran Social Democrat Kantoku Teruya, who held the district continuously from 2003 to 2021. Such is the strength of the SDP vote in the district that during the LDP landslides in 2005 and 2012, Teruya still managed to hold the district comfortably. The significant presence of US military bases in Ginowan is regarded as a major factor contributing to the wide aversion of the local population to voting LDP candidates, who are typically pro-base. Teruya retired before the 2021 elections but Kunio Arakaki, the former mayor of Kitanakagusuku, managed to hold the seat for the SDP. 

Okinawa-2nd is also one of the few districts that the JCP regularly skips from contesting. The party continuously endorsed Teruya in each election since 2009. Other centre-left parties have also generally refrained from contesting the district and regularly backed Teruya in general elections.

List of representatives

Election results

References 

Districts of the House of Representatives (Japan)